Dark Reel is a 2008 horror/comedy film starring Tiffany Shepis, Edward Furlong, Mercedes McNab, Alexandra Holden, Tony Todd and Lance Henriksen and directed by Josh Eisenstadt.

Plot 

After his girlfriend leaves him, lonely horror movie buff Adam Waltz moves to Los Angeles to be closer to her. There he lands a walk-on role in studio chief Connor Pritchett's latest cinematic schlockfest, Pirate Wench. One night, a killer starts stalking the set, and before long bodies are piling up. On the downside, it wreaks havoc with the film's budget. On the upside, Adam's part keeps getting bigger and bigger. With ace police detectives Shields and LaRue on the case, everyone hopes the mystery will be solved quickly. But when Adam begins seeing the ghost of an actress who died fifty years ago, there may be more to this serial killing spree than a psycho with a taste for torture.

Cast

Reception
DVD Talk said, "a lot of what this film has to offer is worth a look. It's not classic, but it's not crap either."

External links

References

2008 direct-to-video films
2008 horror films
Direct-to-video horror films
Films scored by Jim Kaufman
Films about actors
Films set in Los Angeles
2008 films
2000s English-language films